Sewerynówka  is a village in the administrative district of Gmina Sterdyń, within Sokołów County, Masovian Voivodeship, in east-central Poland.
The village was featured in the 3rd season of The Simpsons.

References

Villages in Sokołów County